Oleksa Storozhenko (24 November 1806, Lysohory, Chernihiv region, Ukraine – 6 November 1874, Berestia, Belarus) was a Ukrainian writer, anthropologist and playwright.

Storozhenko began writing in the 1850s. Many of his works are based on Ukrainian folklore and stories from lives of Ukrainian peasants. He initially wrote in Russian.<ref>Odarchenko, Petro, 1993, Storozhenko Oleksa'' in Encyclopedia of Ukraine, vol. 5</ref> In 1861 Oleksa Storozhenko became known as Ukrainian-language writer. His works were published in Osnova journal (Ukrainian journal published in Saint Petersburg).  However, measures undertaken by the Imperial Russia's agencies enforcing the Valuev Circular (a legal decree reflecting persecution against the Ukrainian language) became the reason why Oleksa Storozhenko had to continue his writings in Russian.

Storozhenko's style of writing is marked by earthy Ukrainian language and picturesque representation of the folk proverbs, anecdotes, sayings and songs. The leading topics of his works are: Ukrainians’ everyday life, customs, folklore and demonological believes, historical events, particularly kozaks and Zaporozhian Sich.

Novella Zakokhanyi Chort (Devil in Love) and novel Marko Prokliatyi (Damned Marko) are fine examples of Gothic-Romantic literature. Literary critics find parallel between Storozhenko's Devil in Love and Le Diable Amoureux (The Devil in Love, 1772) by the French gothic author, Jacques Cazotte.

1858 – Rasskazy iz Krestyanskogo Byta Malorossiian (Stories from the Peasant Life of Little Russians).

1857 – Bratiya Bliznetsy (Twin Brothers; historical novel).

1861 – Zakokhanyi Chort (Devil in Love)

1863 – Ukrainski Opovidannia (Ukrainian Stories; a two-volume collection of short stories, which author wrote in 1850, was published in Saint-Petersburg).

1870 – Marko Prokliatyi (Damned Marko; gothic novel, unfinished) Оnly two first chapters of the novel were published during Storozhenko's life (Pravda (The Truth) Lviv, 1870).

Storozhenko's other titles include: Vchy linyvoho ne molotom a holodom (Teach the Lazy Man not by Hammer but by Hunger), Mezhyhorodskyi did (The Old Man from Mezhyhorod), Vusy (The Moustache), Holka (The Needle) and Matusyne Blahoslovennia'' (Mother's Blessing).

References 

1806 births
1874 deaths
Ukrainian male writers
Ukrainian anthropologists